Manny is a common nickname for people with the given name Manuel, Emanuele, Immanuel, Emmanuel, Herman, or  Manfred.

People
Manny Acta (born 1969), Dominican Major League Baseball player, manager and coach
Manny Alexander (born 1971), Dominican former Major League Baseball player
Manny Aparicio (born 1995), Canadian soccer player
Manny Aragon (born 1947), former New Mexico State Senator, later convicted of conspiracy to defraud
Manny Banuelos (born 1991), Mexican pitcher in Major League Baseball
Emmanuel Burriss (born 1985), American Major League Baseball player
Manny Charlton (born 1941), founding member and lead guitarist of the Scottish hard rock band Nazareth
Manny Corpas (born 1982), Panamanian pitcher in Major League Baseball and the Mexican Baseball League
Manny Coto, Cuban-American film and television writer, director and producer
Manny Curtis (1911–1984), American songwriter born Emanuel Kurtz
Manny Delcarmen (born 1982), American pitcher in the Mexican Baseball League
Manny Diaz (disambiguation), several people
Manny Elias (born 1953), Indian-born English drummer, original drummer of Tears for Fears
Manny Fernandez (disambiguation), several people
Manny González (soccer) (born 1990), Colombian-American soccer player
Manny Jacinto (born 1987), Filipino-born Canadian actor
Manny Jones (born 1999), American football player
Manny Lawson (born 1984), American National Football League player
Manny Lehman (computer scientist) (1925–2010), German-born British professor of computer science
Manny Machado (born 1992), Dominican-American Major League Baseball player
Manny Malhotra (born 1980), Canadian National Hockey League player
Manny Marroquin (born 1971), Guatemalan-born American mixing engineer
Manny Martínez (baseball) (born 1970), Dominican Major League Baseball player
Manny Mota (born 1938), Dominican Major League Baseball player
Manny Muscat (born 1984), Australian-born Maltese footballer
Manny Oquendo (1931–2009), American percussionist
Manny Pacquiao (born 1978), Filipino former boxer and politician
Manny Paner (born 1949), Philippine Basketball Association player, member of the PBA Hall of Fame
Manny Pangilinan (born 1946), Filipino businessman
Manny Parra (born 1982), American Major League Baseball pitcher
Manny Pérez (born 1969), Dominican-American actor
Manny Piña (born 1987), Venezuelan baseball player
Manny Ramirez (born 1972), Dominican-American retired Major League Baseball player
Manny Ramirez (American football) (born 1983), American National Football League player
Emanuel (Manny) Rosenfeld (died 1959), co-founder and CEO of the Pep Boys automotive aftermarket chain
Manny Sanguillén (born 1944), Panamanian Major League Baseball player
Manny Súarez (born 1993), Chilean-Spanish basketball player
Manny Trillo (born 1950), Venezuelan Major League Baseball player
Manny Victorino (born 1959), Philippine Basketball Association player
Manny Villar, Jr. (born 1949), Filipino businessman and politician
Manny Wilkins (born 1995), American football player

Fictional characters
 Manny Armstrong, a Ben 10 character
 Manny Bianco, in the sitcom Black Books
 Manny Calavera, the main character of Lucasarts video game Grim Fandango
 Manny Heffley, one of the main characters in the Diary of a Wimpy Kid book and film series
 Manuel "Manny" O'Kelly-Davis, in The Moon Is a Harsh Mistress, a science fiction novel by Robert Heinlein
 Manny Rivera, the titular character of Nickelodeon's El Tigre: The Adventures of Manny Rivera 
 Manny Santos, in the Canadian television drama Degrassi: The Next Generation
 Manny Spamboni, in the 2009 revival version of The Electric Company
 Manny (Ice Age), a woolly mammoth in the Ice Age film series
 Manny, a praying mantis in the 1998 Disney/Pixar animated film A Bug's Life
 Manny, the titular character of Handy Manny, a children's television series
 Manny Delgado, in the ABC sitcom Modern Family, played by Rico Rodriguez
 Manny Pardo, a police detective from Hotline Miami 2: Wrong Number
 Manny Alvarez, in The Last of Us: Part II, played by Alejandro Edda
Manny Quinlan, friend and police contact of Harry Orwell, played by Henry Darrow in the television series Harry O

See also
 Mannie, a given name

Masculine given names
Hypocorisms